The Diocese of the Southern Cross is a new Anglican diocese in Australia unaffiliated with the Anglican Church of Australia. It is to be led by a former Archbishop of Sydney, Glenn Davies.

History 
The diocese was formed by GAFCON Australia in August 2022, following a split from the Anglican Church of Australia over same-sex marriage among other issues. 

The diocese is backed by the Sydney diocese and the Bishop of Tasmania, Richard Condie.

Initially, the diocese had three congregations. The first congregation was in Beenleigh, Queensland, while a second in Brisbane joined in September 2022. A third congregation joined the Diocese in January 2023. Its fourth congregation joined on 30 January 2023. The diocese also welcomed its first female pastoral clergywoman.

References

External links

Anglicanism in Australia
Southern Cross
Anglican denominations established in the 21st century
Christian organizations established in 2022
2022 establishments in Australia
Evangelical Anglicanism
Southern Cross
Schisms in Christianity